Wagerson Ramos dos Santos, Gerson (Valença, Rio de Janeiro, April 3, 1986) is a Brazilian footballer.

Career
In April 2010, Gerson signed a two-year contract with Fluminense. He was a reserve player during the 2010 season.
On 19 May 2011, Goianiense signed Gerson from Fluminense on loan until the end of the 2011 season.
On 22 September 2011, Gerson moved to Brazilian Série B side Goiás on a loan deal.

Career statistics
(Correct )

Honours 
América
 Campeonato Carioca Série B: 2009

Brasiliense
 Campeonato Brasiliense: 2017

References

External links
 ogol.com
 

Gerson at ZeroZero

1986 births
Living people
Brazilian footballers
Campeonato Brasileiro Série A players
Campeonato Brasileiro Série B players
Campeonato Brasileiro Série C players
Boavista Sport Club players
Duque de Caxias Futebol Clube players
Associação Desportiva Cabofriense players
Goytacaz Futebol Clube players
Volta Redonda FC players
America Football Club (RJ) players
Fluminense FC players
Atlético Clube Goianiense players
Goiás Esporte Clube players
Macaé Esporte Futebol Clube players
Resende Futebol Clube players
Clube Atlético Tricordiano players
Brasiliense Futebol Clube players
Clube do Remo players
Operário Futebol Clube (MS) players
Artsul Futebol Clube players
Association football fullbacks